Clophill is a village and civil parish clustered on the north bank of the River Flit, Bedfordshire, England. It is recorded in the Domesday Book of 1086 as Clopelle. "Clop" likely means 'tree-stump' in Old English. However, it also has cognate terms for clay, with which the soil of mid Bedfordshire is rich.

Extent and demography
In the 1851 census, the men of the parish numbered 560; of these, 238 were agricultural labourers; women numbered. In the 2011 Census the population was 1,750. 
  The contiguous housing of Clophill Road and its side streets falls into the civil and ecclesiastical parishes of Maulden.

Church

St Mary's old church

The old St Mary's Church was built around 1350, and replaced by a new church in the 1840s (250 m SSW). It gradually fell into ruin, and as an inactive church, had restoration carried out for secular purposes in the early 2010s.

Active churches

The new St Mary's church is in the High Street, built 1848–1849. The current rector is  Lynda Klimas. It is the only church of the Church of England  parish, which reflects the civil parish having the A6 Bedford Road as its western limit.

Clophill Methodist Church has an active congregation, social meetings on site and in the schoolroom and was built in about the year 1930. It joins with St Mary's Church in some major services.

Public houses and restaurants
on the Green/High Street
 The Flying Horse
 The Green Man - 'Pub' - BURNT DOWN 21st December 2023
on Back Street
 The Stone Jug''

Notable residents

Boss Meyer, educator and cricketer. Founder of Millfield School.
David L. Englin, politician
Leon Emirali, political commentator and entrepreneur
Jimmy Husband, (born 15 October 1947), retired professional footballer
John van Weenen, OMT MBE, (born 26 August 1941, Enfield, Middlesex), 8th Dan karateka and humanitarian
Sir Douglas Frederick Howard, KCMG, MC, (15 February 1897 – 26 December 1987), diplomat

Sports and Leisure Facilities
The Greensand Ridge Walk and the Greensand Cycle Way pass through Clophill.

The village has a youth football club called Clophill United FC.  The 2020/21 season has five teams (U15s to 11s) playing in the Beds Youth Saturday League and the Chiltern Junior 7s.

Notes and References

Further reading

External links

Official Clophill Parish Council Website
Clophill pages at the Bedfordshire and Luton Archives and Records Service
Official Clophill Village Church Website
British History article on Clophill, excerpt from 'A History of the County of Bedford Vol 2', written 1908 by William Page Clophill History
Official Clophill United FC Website (Youth Teams)

Villages in Bedfordshire
Civil parishes in Bedfordshire
Central Bedfordshire District